PlayAround was formed by Joel H. Martin, co-founder of American Multiple Industries, the first Atari 2600 adult video game company. PlayAround purchased the rights to American Multiple Industries's titles and released them as "double-enders" - extra-long cartridges that had a different game on each end. PlayAround released additional titles unique from those picked up from American Multiple Industries, and made female versions of several of their games to try to tap into another market, which didn't work very well. While the games' themes may be considered adult, the graphics are quite blocky and generally poor enough that it takes quite an imagination to see them as anything more than a novelty.

List of PlayAround games

Beat' Em and Eat' Em/Philly Flasher
 For more, see Beat 'Em and Eat 'Em

Burning Desire/Jungle Fever
 In Burning Desire, the player assumes the role of a nude man hovering over on a helicopter trying to save a woman from getting consumed by flames, while dodging stones being thrown at him by cannibals. He ejaculates to put out the fire, then he has the woman latch onto his penis and airs her to safety. In Jungle Fever, the roles are reversed and the player controls a woman who lactates the fire out.

Knight on the Town/Lady in Wading
 In Knight on the Town, one plays a knight who needs to get across the moat to save a buxom princess, but the only way across is for the knight to build a drawbridge, piece by piece. While building the bridge, the knight must dodge a dragon's fire, an alligator swimming in the moat and a little gremlin with a big mouth to bite the knight's blade off. To make matters worse, the gremlin moves faster for every piece of bridge placed. The goal of this game is to get across a completed drawbridge and climb to the top of the tower to get the princess in the least amount of time. For Lady in Wading, a studly prince is abducted and an Amazon takes the knight's place.

Cathouse Blues/Gigolo
 Both games are Memory-style games to test your memory. In Cathouse Blues, the playable character is a man on a mission to find and score with 7 different women in a large neighborhood and the women are paid upon finding the right house. However, there are empty houses with alarms that can stun him temporarily. Also wandering the streets are police officers ready to capture you. Also on hand is a mugger who chases after the man if he is carrying too much money. If the player runs into him, the game is over. In Gigolo, it's a woman who looks for 7 different men.

Bachelor/Bachelorette Party

 This game is similar to Breakout! and Arkanoid in gameplay, but instead of bricks and Pong balls, there are walls of nude women and a nude man to bounce around with a paddle. The roles are reversed in Bachelorette Party.

General Retreat/Westward Ho!
Another double-ended game was released in Europe called General Retreat/Westward Ho!, but due to the multiple complaints, negative impact and protests that Custer's Revenge got, it was never released in the U.S. and stayed on European markets.

References

Video game development companies
Video game publishers